One's Company: A Journey to China (London: Cape, 1934) is a travel book by Peter Fleming, correspondent for The Times of London, describing his journey day-by-day from London through Moscow and the Trans-Siberian Railway, then through Japanese-run Manchukuo, then on to Nanking, the capital of China in the 1930s, with a glimpse of “Red China”. It was reissued (with News from Tartary) as half of Travels in Tartary.

Fleming's Preface opens with a self-deprecating observation:

The recorded history of Chinese civilization covers a period of four thousand years.
The Population of China is estimated at 450 million.
China is larger than Europe.
   
The author of this book is twenty-six years old.
He has spent, altogether, about seven months in China.
He does not speak Chinese.

British in its insouciant class condescension (Moscow was like a “servant’s quarters”) and offhand anti-Semitism (the Soviet Union is run by Jews), the tone is imperially comic and the judgments quick, though always focused on the author. When Fleming gets to China, the reader is rewarded with acid portraits of Chiang Kai-shek, pronouncements on “Red China” and the prospects of Communism (it could never take hold in China), life on the war fronts, and the nature of the Japanese empire. Nicholas J. Clifford observes: “If for Fleming... China remained something of a joke, the joke was less on the country than on the bemused traveler himself.... Even so, the humor ... can sometimes wear a little thin.... there was much about it that still had the aspect of a comic opera land whose quirks and oddities became grist for the writer rather than deserving any respect or sympathy in themselves.” However, one unsympathetic commentator recently described it as "largely a litany of visits to places he didn't like -- except England."

Notes

1936 non-fiction books
Books about China
British travel books
English non-fiction books